Ayguatébia-Talau is a commune in the Pyrénées-Orientales department in southern France. Prior to 1983, It was known as Ayguatébia.

Geography

Location 
Ayguatébia-Talau is located in the canton of Les Pyrénées catalanes and in the arrondissement of Prades.

Toponymy 
Attested forms
The name of Ayguatébia appears in 958 as Aqua tebeda, immediately followed in 959 by Aquatepida. Villa Aque tepida is used during the 11th century and Aiguetevia is found in 1392. From the 17th century and on, the common forms are Aiguetebia and Ayguatebia. The modern spelling in Catalan is Aiguatèbia, but the traditional spelling, Ayguatèbia, should be preferred.

The name of Talau appears in 874 as Villa Talatio and in 876 as Talacho. Talazo, Talaz and Talaxo are used during the 10th century. Talau appears in the 13th century and is used since.

Etymology
The name of Ayguatébia comes from the Latin aqua tebeda, meaning lukewarm water, in relation with warm springs found in Ayguatébia.

The name of Talau comes from a pre-Latin radical, Tal or Tala, meaning a small plateau found above a cliff or a hill, which corresponds to the situation of the village of Talau, located above the valley of the Cabrils river.

History 
The commune Ayguatébia-Talau was created on January 1, 1983, by uniting the former communes of Ayguatébia and Talau.

Government and politics

Mayors

Population

Architecture 
 Saint-Felix and Saint-Armengol church in Ayguatébia
 Saint-Stephen church in Talau
 Saint-Michael of the Plans church

Notable people 
 Saint Ermengol (?–1035) was possibly born in Ayguatébia.

See also
Communes of the Pyrénées-Orientales department

References

External links 
IGN

Communes of Pyrénées-Orientales
Pyrénées-Atlantiques communes articles needing translation from French Wikipedia